Eledone caparti is a rare and little known species of benthic octopus from the Atlantic Ocean off the south-west coast of Africa. The egg masses of Eledone caparti have been found in the dissected stomachs of blue sharks.

References

caparti
Molluscs described in 1950